Itzhak de Laat (born 13 June 1994) is a Dutch short track speed skater.

Career
Influenced by his father, De Laat started with speed skating when he was eight years old, starting at the Trias Short Track Club in Leeuwarden.
He won the gold medal in the 5000m relay event at the 2017 World Championships in Rotterdam in his own country.

He qualified for the 2018 Winter Olympics in the men's 1000 m, men's 1500 m and 5000 m relay event.

Inspired by metal music, he designs the images on his own helmets.

References

External links
 
 

1994 births
Living people
Dutch male short track speed skaters
Olympic short track speed skaters of the Netherlands
Short track speed skaters at the 2018 Winter Olympics
Short track speed skaters at the 2022 Winter Olympics
World Short Track Speed Skating Championships medalists
Sportspeople from Leeuwarden
21st-century Dutch people